São Gabriel is a Belo Horizonte Metro station on Line 1. It was opened on 5 January 2002 as a one-station extension of the line from Minas Shopping. In April 2002, the line was extended to Primeiro de Maio. The station is located between Minas Shopping and Primeiro de Maio.

References

Belo Horizonte Metro stations
2002 establishments in Brazil
Railway stations opened in 2002